Painted Rock or Painted Rocks may refer to:

Geographic locations

United States

Painted Rock (San Luis Obispo County, California), rock formation
Painted Rocks State Park, a Montana state park
Yakima Indian Painted Rocks, state park in Washington 
Painted Rock Petroglyph Site, archaeological site and BLM facility  near Theba, Arizona, listed on the U.S. National Register of Historic Places, formerly part of Painted Rock State Park
Painted Rock Mountains, a mountain range in Maricopa County, Arizona
Painted Rock Dam and associated reservoir, Arizona

Australia

Painted Rocks (Western Australia), a rock in Western Australia

See also
Paint Rock (disambiguation)
Painted Desert (disambiguation)
Petroglyph
Rock Art or Petrographs
Rock Painting, the Finnish music album
The Kindness Rock Project, a viral rock painting trend